The Carolina Peacemaker is an African-American weekly newspaper in Greensboro in the U.S. state of North Carolina. It began publication in 1967 and is a member of the National Newspaper Publishers Association and the North Carolina Press Association. It has a weekly circulation of 9,100 copies.

History
The paper was founded in 1967 by Dr. John Kilimanjaro, a professor at North Carolina A&T State University. Kilimanjaro served as the president and publisher of the Carolina Peacemaker until his death in 2019.

The paper endorsed Democratic candidate Tom Gilmore in the 1984 North Carolina Democratic gubernatorial primary.

An editorial criticizing the film The Color Purple for its portrayal of a same-sex relationship between two women appeared in the paper in 1986. The Carolina Peacemaker published a rebuttal to the editorial soon after.

References

African-American newspapers
Weekly newspapers published in North Carolina
Greensboro, North Carolina
1967 establishments in North Carolina
Publications established in 1967
Mass media in Greensboro, North Carolina
Independent newspapers published in the United States